The Centre Agnico Eagle, formerly known as the Centre Air Creebec and Palais des Sports, is a 3,504 capacity (2,140 seated) multi-purpose arena in Val-d'Or, Quebec, Canada. It is home to the Val-d'Or Foreurs ice hockey team. It was built in 1949 and renamed for corporate sponsor Air Creebec in November 2005. The arena is known for its diagonal scoreboard which was added in 2008.

Past events
In the past, the arena has hosted: 
1998 - President's Cup (QMJHL) Final Vs Rimouski Océanic
2001 - President's Cup (QMJHL) Final Vs Acadie–Bathurst Titan
2007 - President's Cup (QMJHL) Final Vs Lewiston Maineiacs
2014 - President's Cup (QMJHL) Final Vs Baie-Comeau Drakkar

References

External links

 Les Foreurs de Val-d'Or 

Indoor arenas in Quebec
Indoor ice hockey venues in Quebec
Sports venues in Quebec
Quebec Major Junior Hockey League arenas
Sport in Abitibi-Témiscamingue
Val-d'Or
Buildings and structures in Abitibi-Témiscamingue